Syed Karim (born 21 May 1984) is a professional footballer who plays for Tanjong Pagar United FC in the S.League.

He is a natural centre midfielder.

Club career
Syed Karim has previously played for S.League clubs Gombak United FC, Singapore Armed Forces FC and Woodlands Wellington FC.

He made his debut in Asia's premier club competition, AFC Champions League, as a second-half substitute in a group stage match against Kashima Antlers on 22 April 2009.

Honours

Club

Singapore Armed Forces
S.League: 2008,2009
Singapore Cup: 2008

References

External links
sleague.com
data2.7m.cn

Singaporean footballers
Tanjong Pagar United FC players
Living people
1984 births
Warriors FC players
Gombak United FC players
Woodlands Wellington FC players
Singapore Premier League players
Association football midfielders